The William B. Coley Award for Distinguished Research in Basic and Tumor Immunology is presented annually by the Cancer Research Institute, to scientists who have made outstanding achievements in the fields of basic and tumor immunology and whose work has deepened our understanding of the immune system's response to disease, including cancer.

The first awards were made in 1975 to a group of 16 scientists called the "Founders of Cancer Immunology." In 1993, the award was renamed after William B. Coley, a late-nineteenth century surgeon who made the first attempts at the non-surgical treatment of cancer through stimulation of the immune system. For this reason, Coley has become known as the "Father of Cancer Immunotherapy."

Recipients
Source:

1975: Garry AbelevEdward A. BoyseEdgar J. FoleyRobert A. GoodPeter A. Gorer, FRSLudwik GrossGertrude Henle & Werner HenleRobert J. HuebnerEdmund KleinEva Klein & George KleinDonald L. MortonLloyd J. OldRichmond T. PrehnHans O. Sjögren
1978: Howard B. AndervontEarl L. Green & : Margaret C. GreenWalter E. HestonClarence C. LittleGeorge D. SnellLeonell C. Strong
1979: Yuang-yun ChuZongtang SunZhao-you Tang
1983: Richard K. Gershon
1987: Thierry BoonRolf M. Zinkernagel
1989: Alain TownsendEmil Unanue
1993: Pamela BjorkmanJohn KapplerPhilippa MarrackAlvaro MoralesJack StromingerDon Wiley
1995: Malcolm A. S. MooreTimothy Springer
1996: 
1997: 
1998: Klas KärreRalph M. Steinman
1999: James E. Darnell, Jr.Ian M. KerrRichard A. Lerner, FRSGreg Winter
2000: Mark M. Davis
2001: Robert D. Schreiber
2002: Lewis LanierDavid H. Raulet
2003: Jules A. HoffmannCharles JanewayBruno LemaitreRuslan Medzhitov
2004: Shimon SakaguchiEthan M. Shevach
2005: For Distinguished Research in Basic and Tumor ImmunologyJames P. Allison
2006: For Distinguished Research in Basic ImmunologyShizuo AkiraBruce A. BeutlerFor Distinguished Research in Tumor ImmunologyIan H. FrazerHarald zur Hausen
2007: For Distinguished Research in Basic and Tumor ImmunologyJeffrey V. Ravetch
2008: For Distinguished Research in Basic and Tumor Immunology, FRS
2009: For Distinguished Research in Tumor ImmunologyFor Distinguished Research in Basic Immunology (joint prize)Frederick W. AltKlaus Rajewsky
2010: For Distinguished Research in Tumor ImmunologyJérôme Galon
2011: For Distinguished Research in Tumor Immunology (joint prize)Steven A. Rosenberg
2012: For Distinguished Research in Basic Immunology (joint prize)Richard A. Flavell, FRS.Laurie H. GlimcherFor Distinguished Research in Tumor Immunology (joint prize)Carl H. JuneMichel Sadelain
2013: For Distinguished Research in Basic ImmunologyMichael B. Karin
2014: For Distinguished Research in Tumor Immunology (joint prize)Tasuku Honjo  Arlene Sharpe 
2015: , for Distinguished Research in Tumor ImmunologyAlexander Y. Rudensky, for Distinguished Research in Basic Immunology
2016: , for Distinguished Research in Tumor ImmunologyDan R. Littman, for Distinguished Research in Basic Immunology
2017: Thomas F. Gajewski, for Distinguished Research in Tumor ImmunologyRafi Ahmed, for Distinguished Research in Basic Immunology
2018: Miriam Merad, for Distinguished Research in Basic ImmunologyPadmanee Sharma, for Distinguished Research in Tumor Immunology
2019:For Distinguished Research in Basic ImmunologyZelig Eshhar Lawrence E. SamelsonBrian SeedArthur WeissFor Distinguished Research in Tumor ImmunologyElizabeth M. Jaffee Antoni Ribas
2020:For Distinguished Research in Basic Immunology and Tumor ImmunologyAndrea Ablasser Glen N. BarberZhijian J. ChenVeit HornungRussell E. Vance

See also

 List of biomedical science awards

References

Biomedical awards
Cancer research awards
Immunology
Awards established in 1975